Calvatia bovista is a species of Calvatia mushroom, the second largest Calvatia in North America. As with other Calvatia mushrooms, it is edible when young, and it is used in medicine.

Description
Spores are 4-6μm, round, minutely warted or spiny. It is seen in pastures, open woods, etc., fairly common.

References

External links
 Calvatia bovista at Mushroomobserver.org.

Agaricaceae
Fungi of North America
Fungi of the United States
Fungi without expected TNC conservation status